Zhang Weiying (born October 1, 1959) is a Chinese economist and was head of the Guanghua School of Management, Peking University. He is known for his advocacy of free markets and his ideas have been influenced by the Austrian School.

Biography
Zhang Weiying was born into a peasant family. He graduated with a bachelor's degree in 1982, and a master's degree in 1984, from Northwest University (China). He received his M. Phil. in economics in 1992 and D. Phil. in economics from Oxford University. His D. Phil. supervisors were James Mirrlees (1996 Nobel Laureate) and Donald Hay. Between 1984 and 1990, he was a research fellow of the Economic System Reform Institute of China under the State Commission of Restructuring Economic System. During this period, he was heavily involved in economic reform policy-making in China. He was the first Chinese economist who proposed the "dual-track price system" (in 1984) and emerged as a strong voice in arguing for it as a mechanism of reform during the Moganshan Youth Conference.  Zhang was also known for his contributions to macro-control policy debating, ownership reform debating, and entrepreneurship studies. After he graduated from Oxford, he co-founded China Center for Economic Research (CCER), Peking University in 1994, and worked with the Center first as an associate professor and then as a professor until August 1997. He then moved to Peking University's Guanghua School of Management in September 1997. He was removed as Dean from the Guanghua School of Management in 2010; the removal was attributed to his radical views, which distracted him from the responsibilities of being a dean, according to one teacher at the school.

Zhang Weiying is the Sinar Mas Chair Professor of Economics at Peking University's National School of Development.

References

1959 births
Alumni of Nuffield College, Oxford
Alumni of New College, Oxford
Austrian School economists
People's Republic of China economists
Chinese classical liberals
Living people
Academic staff of Peking University
Northwest University (China) alumni
Economists from Shaanxi
Writers from Yulin, Shaanxi
People's Republic of China writers
Educators from Shaanxi